Cheshmeh Mantash (also Romanized as Chashmeh Mantash; also known as Chashmeh Mantas, Cheshmeh Mansh, and Cheshmeh Mīsh) is a village in Khosrowabad Rural District, Chang Almas District, Bijar County, Kurdistan Province, Iran. At the 2006 census, its population was 1,012, in 228 families. The village is populated by Kurds.

References 

Towns and villages in Bijar County
Kurdish settlements in Kurdistan Province